Major General Jarallah Alaluwayt is the current commander of the fifth branch of Royal Saudi Armed Forces: the Royal Saudi Strategic Missile Force. He had officially opened the new HQ and Academy building of Strategic Missile Force in Riyadh during July 2013.
Starting from 2013 his name and photos are officially opened for the general public, his personality is not classified as it was used before for all information connected with Royal Saudi Strategic Missile Force.

His post became even more important since the Nuclear program of Saudi Arabia has been pushed forward from 2009 according to the declaration by King Abdullah of Saudi Arabia and prince Turki bin Faisal Al Saud.

Jarallah Alaluwayt is probably the first and the only one commander of such military branch among all Arab and Muslim countries. Pakistan has strategic ballistic missiles too, but they are not a separate branch of the military; the Army Strategic Forces Command is subordinate of Pakistan Army.

References

External links
RSSMF official website server with IP:195.10.197.7 

Living people
Saudi Arabian military personnel
Year of birth missing (living people)